Ollie Hayes (born 2 April 1990) is an English rugby union player for Bristol Rugby   . Having started his career at Bath Academy he moved to Bristol Guinness Premiership in 2008. He made his Premiership debut in March 2009 against Bath. Ollie played 48 games and scored 20 points during his time with Bristol in both Guinness Premiership and English Championship (rugby union)|RFU Championship 
Worcester Warriors announced the mobile hookers signing in March 2011. Ollie arrived at Sixways with an existing injury and after a summer operation made his Warriors debut, in the Worcester Cavaliers 29-24 victory against Exeter United, 5 September 2011 at Sandy Park. He has played for England U18.

Hayes came off the bench to score Warriors' bonus-point try against Northampton Saints in September 2012, helping his side to their first try bonus-point since 2009.

On 1 June 2013 he resigned for Bristol Rugby after two years away from the club and now has over 70 appearances for the Bristol rugby.
After a season back at Bristol he Signed for Yorkshire Carnegie on a 2 year contract.

He plays as a hooker.
Ollie was forced to retired aged 25 due to an injury. He currently runs his own mobile Personal Training business in Bath

References

External links
Worcester Warriors profile
http://www.warriors.co.uk/warriors/matchcentre/players_warriors_first_team.php?player=73528&includeref=dynamic

1990 births
Living people
Bristol Bears players
English rugby union players
Leeds Tykes players
Rugby union players from Bath, Somerset
Worcester Warriors players
Rugby union hookers